Federal is a rural locality in the Shire of Noosa, Queensland, Australia. In the  Federal had a population of 303. It is located in the Sunshine Coast hinterland near the towns of Cooran and Pomona.

Geography 
Skyring Creek, a tributary of the Mary River forms part of the northwest boundary of the locality. Federal is traversed by the Bruce Highway. The highway has seen two recent upgrades - one to the north and one to the south of Federal - costing more than $500 million each.

The land use is predominantly grazing on native vegetation.

History

The area was originally known as Skyring Creek after brothers Zachariah and Daniel Skyring who established cattle runs in the district circa 1853. Their runs were named Canando, Yandina, Whidlka Whidlka (later Tuchekoi) and Pooreema, in total  of land north of the Maroochy River.

The name Federal refers to the arrival of a group of selectors from Federal in New South Wales in 1905–6.

Federal State School opened on 14 February 1910.

Federal Memorial Hall opened on 26 September 1930.

Between 2008 and 2013 Federal (and the rest of the Shire of Noosa) was within Sunshine Coast Region).

At the  the locality of Federal recorded a population of 320.

In the  Federal had a population of 303 .

Heritage listings
Federal has a number of heritage-listed sites, including:

 1612 Bruce Highway: Federal State School
 1642 Bruce Highway: Federal Memorial Hall

Education
Federal State School is a government primary (Prep-6) school for boys and girls at 40 Middle Creek Road. In 2018, the school had an enrolment of 89 students with 11 teachers (7 full-time equivalent) and 7 non-teaching staff (4 full-time equivalent).

There is no secondary school in Federal. The nearest secondary school is Noosa District State High School which has its junior campus at neighbouring Pomona to the north-east and its senior campus at Cooroy to the east.

Amenities
The Shire of Noosa operates a mobile library on a weekly schedule at the Federal State School during the school terms.

Social life centres on the Federal Memorial Hall on 2 Skyring Road (Old Bruce Highway).

Economy
There are a number of homesteads in the locality:

 Cliona Lodge
 Dunromin
 Monte Video

References

Sources

 

Suburbs of Noosa Shire, Queensland
Localities in Queensland